The 2009 ICC World Twenty20 was an international Twenty20 cricket tournament organised by the International Cricket Council (ICC) that took place in England in June 2009. It was the second ICC World Twenty20 tournament, following the inaugural event in South Africa in September 2007. As before, the tournament featured 12 male teams – nine of the ten Test-playing nations and three associate nations, which earned their places through a qualification tournament. Matches were played at three English grounds – Lord's and The Oval in London, and Trent Bridge in Nottingham. The tournament was organised in parallel with the women's tournament, with the men's semi-finals and final being preceded by the semi-finals and final from the women's event. The final took place at Lord's on Sunday 21 June with Pakistan beating Sri Lanka by eight wickets and England beating New Zealand by six wickets in the women's final.

Background
In June 2006, The Daily Telegraph reported that the Marylebone Cricket Club and Surrey CCC had put in a joint bid to host the tournament at Lord's and The Oval.

In December 2007, the ICC provisionally approved a Women's World Twenty20 to run alongside the men's event which, subject to the approval of the ICC's finance and commercial affairs committee, would come into effect for the 2009 tournament in England.

In early January 2008, speculation arose that the tournament could be held elsewhere as the British government have banned Zimbabwe from touring England in 2009. However, it was later confirmed that the tournament would definitely take place in the country.

In April 2008, the third venue was confirmed as Nottingham's Trent Bridge; the 17,500 seater stadium was chosen to hold one of the semi-finals, among other earlier matches. Lord's and The Oval are the two other confirmed venues, with the opening match and final being played at Lord's. Old Trafford Cricket Ground had bid for the third venue, but Trent Bridge was chosen for its closer proximity to the two London grounds.

Qualification

Although early reports suggested the 2009 event may involve just eight teams in a nine-day event, the full twelve-team tournament was confirmed, featuring the Test-playing nations and two qualifying associate nations. However, in July 2008 Zimbabwe, under pressure from South Africa and England over political matters related to Robert Mugabe, pulled out of the tournament of their own volition, creating an additional space for an associate nation.

Qualification was achieved by the finalists of an ICC World Twenty20 Qualifier held in Belfast from 2–4 August 2008, between Kenya, Scotland, Ireland, Netherlands, Canada and Bermuda. Ireland and the Netherlands, having reached the final, qualified outright, while Scotland won the third place playoff beating Kenya to also qualify.

Venues
The matches were played at the following three grounds:

Rules and regulations
During the group stage and Super Eight, points are awarded to the teams as follows:

In case of a tie (i.e. both teams score the same number of runs at the end of their respective innings), a Super Over decides the winner. This applies in all stages of the tournament.

Within each group (both group stage and Super Eight stage), teams are ranked against each other based on the following criteria:
 Higher number of points
 If equal, higher number of wins
 If still equal, higher net run rate
 If still equal, lower bowling strike rate
 If still equal, result of head-to-head meeting.

Groups
The groups were announced on 31 October 2007, based on finishing positions at the 2007 ICC World Twenty20 and the successful qualifying associate nations. The initial four group format is the same as that used at the 2007 tournament. Team seed in brackets.

Group A
  (1)
  (8)
  (9)

Group B
  (2)
  (7)
  (10)

Group C
  (3)
  (6)
  (11)

Group D
  (4)
  (5)
  (12)

Squads

Warm-up matches 
All times shown are in British Summer Time (UTC+01).

Group stage

Group A

Group B

Group C

Group D

Super 8s
The Super 8s consisted of two groups: Group E and Group F. Group E consisted of A1, B2, C1, D2 and Group F consisted of A2, B1, C2, D1, where X1 is the first seed from Group X and X2 is the second seed from Group X. The seedings were based on performance in the last ICC T20 (2007). If a non-seeded team knocks out a seeded team, the non-seeded team inherits the seed of the team it knocked out.

Group E

Group F

Knockout stage

Semi-finals

Final

In the final at Lord's, the home of cricket in London, Sri Lanka won the toss and elected to bat. The first over was bowled by Mohammad Amir. After failing to score off the first four balls – all short – Dilshan went for his scoop and mistimed it, resulting in him being caught at short fine-leg. Soon after this, Jehan Mubarak top edged a delivery by Abdul Razzaq which went high in the air and was caught by Shahzaib Hasan, leaving Sri Lanka at 2 for 2. Sanath Jayasuriya was able to stabilise the innings for Sri Lanka hitting 17 runs off 10 balls, however, Jayasuriya soon fell as he dragged a good length ball back on to the stumps. Mahela Jayawardene followed after edging a shot into the hands of Misbah-ul-Haq, leaving Sri Lanka on 32/4. Sangakkara and Chamara Silva added further runs, before the latter was caught by Saeed Ajmal playing a pull shot off the bowling of Umar Gul. Shahid Afridi soon after, took the wicket of Isuru Udana with a googly which drifted into the right-hander, knocking the off-stump. This brought in Angelo Mathews, who along with Sangakkara took the score from 70/6 to 138/6, with 17 runs being scored off the last over bowled by Mohammad Amir. Sri Lanka finished on 138/6 from 20 overs.

Pakistan started off well with openers Kamran Akmal and Shahzaib Hasan adding 48 runs
for the 1st wicket, before Kamran Akmal was stumped by Kumar Sangakkara by the first delivery of Sanath Jayasuriya. Pakistan reached the target in 18.4 overs, with Shahid Afridi, who hit the winning runs, earning Man of the Match while Tillakaratne Dilshan was declared Man of the Series for his 317 runs at an average of 63.40. Pakistan's win, often cheered on by crowds of fans from England's Pakistani communities, marked its first world title since Imran Khan's "cornered tigers" had won the 1992 World Cup.

Match officials

References

 
World Twenty20
ICC Men's T20 World Cup
World Twenty20